The Land Reform (Scotland) Act 2003 is an Act of the Scottish Parliament which establishes statutory public rights of access to land and makes provisions under which bodies representing rural and crofting communities may buy land.

Provisions
The 2003 Act includes three main provisions: the creation of a legal framework for land access, the community right to buy, and the crofting community right to buy. The first part of the act codifies into Scots law the right to universal access to land in Scotland.  The act specifically establishes a right to be on land for recreational, educational and certain other purposes and a right to cross land. The rights exist only if they are exercised responsibly, as specified in the Scottish Outdoor Access Code. Access rights apply to any non-motorised activities, including walking, cycling, horse-riding and wild camping. They also allow access on inland water for canoeing, rowing, sailing and swimming.

The second part of the act establishes the community right to buy, allowing communities with populations of up to 10,000 to register an interest in land, entitling them to first right of refusal should the owner put the land up for sale or intend to transfer ownership, provided a representative community body can be formed to carry out the purchase.

Finally, the third part establish the crofting community right to buy which allows crofting communities to purchase crofts and associated land from existing landowners. It differs from the community right to buy in that it can be exercised at any time, regardless of whether the land has been put on the market, allowing crofting communities to purchase land even in the absence of a willing seller.

See also
 Land reform in Scotland
 Community Empowerment (Scotland) Act 2015
 Land Reform (Scotland) Act 2016

References

External links

Acts of the Scottish Parliament 2003
Land reform in Scotland
Scottish culture
Outdoor recreation in Scotland
Scottish coast and countryside
Crofting